The 2018 PSL Collegiate Grand Slam Conference was the fifth conference and fourth indoor tournament for the Philippine Super Liga's sixth season. The games began on November 3, 2018 at the Ynares Sports Arena, Pasig. The conference coincided with the 2018 All-Filipino Conference and utilized a round robin system during the preliminary round with the top four teams advancing to the next round. The losers of the semifinal round competed for the bronze medal while the winners advance to the championship round. The champion will go to a training camp in Thailand.

Teams

Line-up

Preliminary round

Team standings	

|}

Point system:
3 points = win match in 3 or 4 sets
2 points = win match in 5 sets
1 point  = lose match in 5 sets
0 point  = lose match in 3 or 4 sets

	
Match results
All times are in Philippine Standard Time (UTC+08:00)

|}

Final round 
Bronze medal

|}

Gold medal

|}

Final standings

Individual awards

Venues
Ynares Sports Arena

References

All-Filipino
College women's volleyball in the Philippines
PSL